Xerochlora viridipallens is a species of emerald moth in the family Geometridae. It is found in North America.

The MONA or Hodges number for Xerochlora viridipallens is 7078.

References

Further reading

External links

 

Hemitheini
Articles created by Qbugbot
Moths described in 1896